Ymär Sali (Үмәр Сәли; Literary Tatar: Гомәр Сәли, Ğömər Səli - né Alautdinoff/Alautdin, Аляутдинов; February 5, 1876 - August 12, 1951) was a Tatar entrepreneur and leader in the city of Tampere, Finland. As a successful shopkeeper, Sali was the main financial contributor in establishing the congregation for local Tatars and today he is revered as a kind of father figure of the congregation. Sali is also remembered as someone who helped fellow Mishar Tatars moving to Finland and the ones who settled in Saint Petersburg.

Biography 
Ymär Sali (Ümär Säli; né Alautdinoff) was born as the child of Äläwetdin and Zäwcan in Russian Empire, Nizhny Novgorod Governorate - a Tatar village named Aktuk. In 1896 he married Zeliha Gubeidullin (Zäliha Göbäydulla) in the village. Sali had visited Tampere in 1800s as a merchant many times before eventually moving in the city in 1926. 

Sali had a shop in Hämeenkatu, which sold a wide variety of products, such as furs and fabrics. The shop was a place where many local Tatars gathered to talk about their daily lives. He worked in the shop until his death.

Sali has been described as a sensitive person, who deeply loved his people. Due to his financial contribution, The Tampere Islamic Congregation was established in 1943. He operated as chairman of the board for the rest of his life. Before, he had also been a member of the board for The Finnish-Islamic Congregation. When the congregation in Tampere acquired its first property with 960 000 Finnish marks, Sali's portion of it was 596 000. He also donated a house for the congregation, located in Tammelankatu. When the congregation later bought another property, Sali once again donated most of the money. He was also a chairman of the board for The Tampere Turkish Society during 1930's.

Sali took part in a 20-year anniversary celebration of Idel Ural State in Warsaw, Poland - during February 1938. It was organized by a Tatar activist-writer Ayaz Ishaki. He gave Sali the honor of laying down a wreath to a tomb of a Polish Muslim soldier.

During the years 1950-1951, Sali published a magazine called "Islam Mecellesi". It was edited by imam Habiburrahman Shakir. 

Sali came from a very modest countryside and even though he made a lot of money as a businessman, he maintained his humility. His lifestyle was simple and he spent a big portion of his wealth in causes that would help conserve and develop the identity of his people. 

Sali has been named as a key figure in helping Mishar merchants moving from Saint Petersburg to Finland as well as ones who stayed in the city. In 1930, with the help of his stepsister Meryam (mother of artist Aisa Hakimcan), fellow villagers Yarulla Sadretdin, Andercan Zainetdin and Dinmuhammed Ainetdin, Sali tried to bring theologian Musa Bigiev into Finland. The plan was too risky however so it was canceled.

Sali and his wife together took care of their three foster children (Radife, Leyle, Rabia), who had come from Narva as war refugees. The biological child of the Sali's, Abdul-Kayum died young in Leningrad and his son, their grandchild Hasan, disappeared during World War II. In addition to their foster children, they took care of the stepsister of Ymär, Meryam (1863-1947), his mother Zäwcan, and other relatives.

Zeliha was a big supporter of her husband. She has been described as "the mother figure of the congregation". As a talented and tireless hostess, she organized many celebrations. The members of the congregation have said that without Ymär and Zeliha, they would've never been able to establish it or maintain its financial success.

Karan's poem 
When Sali passed away in 1951, the Tatar-born Turkish scientist-writer Lebib Karan (father of actress Lale Oraloğlu) sent his condolences from Istanbul to Tampere in the form of a poem. (Transcribed by a Finnish Tatar Muassäs Baibulat in 2004).

Sources

External links
 Connections between Tatars in Petrograd-Leningrad and Finland during the 1920s and 1930s

Finnish Tatars
20th-century Finnish businesspeople
Islam in Finland
1876 births
1951 deaths